Sunrise was a New Zealand breakfast television news and current affairs programme which was broadcast live on TV3. It aired from 7.00am to 9.00am weekdays, and the show featured all the latest current affairs, News, Sport, Business and Weather. The programme followed ASB Business at 6.30am.

TV3 cancelled Sunrise including ASB Business on 8 April 2010, stating the show was financially unsustainable. A farewell was made by the presenters, at 7:00am on 9 April 2010.

Presenters

As of finale
 Carly Flynn (Host)
 Oliver Driver (Co-Host)
 Sacha McNeil (News)

Backup presenters
 Petra Bagust
 Jaquie Brown

Past presenters
 2007–2008 – James Coleman

Format
Sunrise had news, sport and weather updates every 30 minutes throughout the programme, wrapped around interviews with newsmakers, celebrities and people of interest. ASB Business updates also featured throughout the show, and were hosted by Michael Wilson.

The programme was originally hosted by Carly Flynn and James Coleman, however Coleman resigned in September 2008, hosting his last show on 26 September 2008. Oliver Driver replaced Coleman as Flynn's co-host from 6 October 2008.

Sunrise was supplemented by TV3's midday bulletin 3 News at 12, which first went to air on Tuesday, 2 October 2007.

In a move to give the show a different feel to rivals, Sunrise tended to use both presenters to start discussions with guests, rather than a direct interview.

External links
 
 TV3 Site
 Live Stream

2000s New Zealand television series
2010s New Zealand television series
2007 New Zealand television series debuts
2010 New Zealand television series endings
Breakfast television in New Zealand
New Zealand television news shows
Three (TV channel) original programming